"Ratchet" is a song by English rock band Bloc Party. The song was released on 25 June 2013 as the lead single from the band's third EP The Nextwave Sessions. The song was given its first radio play by Zane Lowe on BBC Radio 1. A music video for the song was also uploaded to the band's Vevo channel on YouTube on the same day of the song's release. The song was featured in the soundtrack for the video game FIFA 14.

Music video
The official music video for the song, lasting three minutes and sixteen seconds, was uploaded on 25 June 2013 to the band's Vevo channel on YouTube. The video, created by English animator Cyriak, features heavily edited footage from past music videos for the songs "Octopus", "Hunting for Witches", "Little Thoughts" and "Helicopter".

Track listing

CD

Digital download

Charts

References

2013 singles
2013 songs
Bloc Party songs
Songs written by Kele Okereke
Frenchkiss Records singles
Songs written by Gordon Moakes
Songs written by Russell Lissack
Songs written by Matt Tong